Mark 25 or MK 25 or variation, may refer to:

 Mark 25, a trailerable sailboat
 Mark 25 torpedo
 MK 25, a variant of the SIG Sauer P226, used by US Navy SEALs
 MK25, a variant of the Medium Tactical Vehicle Replacement
 Spitfire Mk25, an Australian homebuilt aircraft modeled after the WWII British Supermarine Spitfire